The 2002 NCAA Division II men's basketball tournament was the 46th annual single-elimination tournament to determine the national champion of men's NCAA Division II college basketball in the United States.

Officially culminating the 2001–02 NCAA Division II men's basketball season, the tournament featured forty-eight teams from around the country.

The Elite Eight, national semifinals, and championship returned to the Roberts Municipal Stadium in Evansville, Indiana, the home of the first twenty College Division championships between 1957 and 1976.

Metro State (29–6) defeated defending champions Kentucky Wesleyan in the final, 80–72, to win their second Division II national championship and second in three seasons. 

It was also Kentucky Wesleyan's fifth consecutive appearance in the title game (winning in 1999 and 2001), although their appearance was later vacated by the NCAA. 

The Roadrunners were coached by Mike Dunlap. Metro State's Patrick Mutombo was the Most Outstanding Player.

Regionals

Northeast - Old Westbury, New York 
Location: Clark Athletic Center Host: Adelphi University, with support from State University of New York at Old Westbury

Great Lakes - Owensboro, Kentucky 
Location: Sportscenter Host: Kentucky Wesleyan College

South Atlantic - Jefferson City, Tennessee 
Location: Butler-Blanc Gymnasium Host: Carson-Newman College

South - Tampa, Florida 
Location: Bob Martinez Sports Center Host: University of Tampa

East - Indiana, Pennsylvania 
Location: Memorial Field House Host: Indiana University of Pennsylvania

South Central - Tahlequah, Oklahoma 
Location: Dobbins Fieldhouse Host: Northeastern State University

North Central - Brookings, South Dakota 
Location: Frost Arena Host: South Dakota State University

West - San Bernardino, California 
Location: James and Aerianthi Coussoulis Arena Host: California State University, San Bernardino

Elite Eight - Evansville, Indiana
Location: Roberts Municipal Stadium Host: University of Southern Indiana
{{8TeamBracket

 | RD1=National QuarterfinalsElite EightMarch 20
 | RD2=National semifinalsFinal FourMarch 21
 | RD3=National championshipMarch 23

| group1      = 
| group2      = 
| group3      = Evansville, Indiana

| seed-width  = 
| team-width  = 160
| score-width = 

| RD1-seed1  = E
| RD1-team1  = Indiana (PA)
| RD1-score1 = '78
| RD1-seed2  = SC
| RD1-team2  = Northwest Missouri State
| RD1-score2 = 72

| RD1-seed3  = NC
| RD1-team3  = Metro State| RD1-score3 = 65| RD1-seed4  = W
| RD1-team4  = Cal State San Bernardino
| RD1-score4 = 48

| RD1-seed5  = SA
| RD1-team5  = Shaw| RD1-score5 = 102| RD1-seed6  = S
| RD1-team6  = West Georgia
| RD1-score6 = 84

| RD1-seed7  = GL
| RD1-team7  = | RD1-score7 = 71| RD1-seed8  = NE
| RD1-team8  = Adelphi
| RD1-score8 = 46

| RD2-seed1  = E
| RD2-team1  = Indiana (PA)
| RD2-score1 = 52
| RD2-seed2  = SC
| RD2-team2  = Metro State| RD2-score2 = 82| RD2-seed3  = SA
| RD2-team3  = Shaw
| RD2-score3 = 92
| RD2-seed4  = GL
| RD2-team4  = | RD2-score4 = 101| RD3-seed1  = SC
| RD3-team1  = Metro State| RD3-score1 = 80| RD3-seed2  = GL
| RD3-team2  = 
| RD3-score2 = 72
}}Note: Kentucky Wesleyan's performance was vacated by the NCAA.

All-tournament team
 Patrick Mutombo, Metro State (MOP)'''
 Clayton Smith, Metro State
 
 
 Ronald Murray, Shaw

See also
 2002 NCAA Division II women's basketball tournament
 2002 NCAA Division I men's basketball tournament
 2002 NCAA Division III men's basketball tournament
 2002 NAIA Division I men's basketball tournament
 2002 NAIA Division II men's basketball tournament

References
 NCAA Division II men's basketball tournament Results
 2002 NCAA Division II men's basketball tournament jonfmorse.com

NCAA Division II men's basketball tournament
NCAA Division II basketball tournament
NCAA Division II basketball tournament